This is a list of Pakistani sweets and desserts. Many  different 
desserts exist in Pakistani cuisine. Some sweets are the same or are similar to Indian sweets, due to the two countries' shared cultural heritage. Please see the List of Indian sweets and desserts for more details.

Pakistani sweets and desserts

See also

 List of desserts
 South Asian sweets

References

External links

Pakistani

Sweets